John Errington may refer to:

John Edward Errington (1806–1862), English civil engineer
John Errington Moss (born 1940), Canadian author
John Miles (musician) (born John Errington; 1949–2021), British musician